Ribspreader is a Swedish death metal band.

History 
Ribspreader was formed in January 2003 by Rogga Johansson and Andreas Karlsson, both also of Paganizer. The band's debut album featured Swedish musician and producer Dan Swanö on drums and lead guitar.

Johansson is a prolific musician within the death metal genre, and Ribspreader's 2018 album The Van Murders: Part 2 is considered by some to be one of his more versatile and melodic projects, making it more accessible to listeners who are not strictly fans of the genre. Critical praise for 2019's Crawl and Slither was also high, with the album leading some to claim Ribspreader as Johansson's best band. Others, however, have considered Ripspreader to be nearly indistinct from his other projects, even claiming that the band stands out less because of its close adherence to the norms of Swedish death metal.

Members

Current
 Roger "Rogga" Johansson – vocals, rhythm guitar, bass (2002–2014, 2016–present)
 Taylor Nordberg - lead guitar (2016–present)
 Jeramie Kling - drums (2016–present)

Former
 Dan Swanö – lead guitar, drums (2002–2004)
 Andreas Karlsson – lead guitar, bass (2002-2005, 2007-2014)
 Johan Berglund – drums (2004-2005)
 Mattias Fiebig – drums (2005–2007)
 Ronnie Bjornstrom – drums (2007–2009)
 Brynjar Helgetun – drums (2009–2014)

Timeline

Discography

Demo
 Ribspreader – 2002

Studio albums
 Bolted to the Cross – New Aeon Media, 2004
 Congregating the Sick – Karmageddon, 2005
 Opus Ribcage – Vic Records, 2009
 The Van Murders – Vic Records, 2011
 The Kult of The Pneumatic Killrod (And a Collection of Ribs) – Vic Records, 2012
 Meathymns – Vic Records, 2014
The Van Murders: Part 2 – Xtreem Music (2018) 
 Crawl and Slither – 2019

Compilation
 Rotten Rhythms and Rancid Rants (A Collection of Undead Spew) – 2006

References

External links
 Ribspreader on Myspace

Swedish death metal musical groups
Musical groups established in 2002
2002 establishments in Sweden